Vijayabahu VI was the son of Vira Parakrama Bahu VIII, who was an adopted child of Parakrama Bahu VI who founded the Kingdom of Kotte. He was born in c. 1445 and grew up with his brothers Sri Rajasinghe, Dharma Parakramabahu IX, and Raigam Bandara. He also had a sister who was married to Manamperi Arachchi.

Reign
After the death of the elder brother, Dharma Parakramabahu IX, the people of Kotte wanted his half brother, Sakalakala Valla, to become king. At the time he was reigning as a Viceroy at Udugampola. However, according to the Rajavaliya, a narrative of Sinhalese Kings, Vijaya Bahu was crowned as Vijaya Bahu VII by his half brother Sakalakala Valla. He came to the throne in 1513 A.D.

Family
Vijaya Bahu had two wives. The first was Anula Kahatuda, who Vijaya Bahu had cohabited with, along with his brother Sri Rajasinghe who died at Menikkadawara. Anula produced three sons to Vijaya Bahu: Bhuvaneka Bahu, Mayadunne and Maha Raigam Bandara. He also took a queen from Kiravella who had a son called Deva Rajasinghe. This queen successfully persuaded her husband to make her son the King after his death, and Vijaya Bahu planned to murder his three sons.

Vijaya Bahu Kollaya
The three sons, Bhuvaneka Bahu, Mayadunne and Maha Rayigam Bandara had found out their fathers' plans to kill them and install Deva Rajasinghe on the throne of Kotte. They fled the kingdom and sought safety, whilst their father plotted with Ekanayake Mudaliyar and Kandure Bandara. Jaya Vira II, who was married to Mayadunne's cousin, was reigning as the King of Kandy. He provided the three brothers with an army to fight against their father. They planned an attack on Kotte, and Vijaya Bahu struggled to assemble an army, as no one was willing to cause harm to the royal princes. Consequently, he sent messengers to his three sons to ask for peace. They responded by asking for Ekanayaka Mudaliyar and Kandure Bandara to be sent to them, as they had participated in planning their deaths.

Ekanayaka Mudaliyar was able to escape, however Kandure Bandara was brutally murdered. Following this, the young prince Deva Rajasinghe was confronted by Mayadunne, and informed him that his father had a secret army waiting for them  at Kudawatta. An encounter between the army of Vijaya Bahu and Mayadunne's men was avoided, and Mayadunne led his men straight for the palace in Kotte. Everything of value belonging to the king was robbed, while he hid with his wives in the highest point of the palace. Then it was decided that the king should die, however no Sinhalese accepted this task. The murder of the king was carried out by a Muslim man, named Salman.

Following the death of the Vijaya Bahu VII, the kingdom was divided between the three brothers and a new form of government commenced. Bhuvaneka Bahu VII took the kingdom of Kotte, Mayadunne took Sitavaka and Rayigam Bandara had Raigam.

See also
 List of Sri Lankan monarchs
 History of Sri Lanka

References

External links
 Kingdom of Kandy - Mahanuwara
 Kings & Rulers of Sri Lanka
 Codrington's Short History of Ceylon

Monarchs of Kotte
House of Siri Sanga Bo
V
V